James William Hayes is a Hong Kong historian and retired civil servant. He holds a Ph.D. from the University of London.

Biography
James Hayes worked in Hong Kong's New Territories for almost half his thirty-two years of government service. He joined the Hong Kong Government as Cadet Officer Class II in 1956. He retired as Regional Secretary of the New Territories in 1987. He has written extensively on the history and anthropology of the New Territories.

Bibliography
James Hayes' bibliography includes:
Books
 
 
 
 
 
 

Book chapters

 
 
 

Journal articles

Distinctions
 Former President, Royal Asiatic Society Hong Kong Branch (1983–1990)
 Doctor of Letters honoris causa, The University of Hong Kong (1992)
 Honorary Fellow, The Hong Kong University of Science and Technology (2008)
 Honorary Institute Fellow, Hong Kong Institute for the Humanities and Social Sciences, The University of Hong Kong

References

Year of birth missing (living people)
Living people
20th-century Hong Kong historians
Historians of Hong Kong
Hong Kong civil servants
21st-century Hong Kong historians